= Stock theater =

Stock theater may refer to:

- Repertory theatre, a Western theatre or opera production by a resident company
- Summer stock theater, an American theater that presents stage productions only in the summer
